Kerala which is often referred to as 'God's Own Country' has many Hindu temples. Many of the temples have unique traditions and most hold festivals on specific days of the year. Temple festivals usually continue for a number of days. A common characteristic of these festivals is the hoisting of a holy flag which is then brought down only on the final day of the festival. The largest festival in kerala in Pooram category is Arattupuzha Pooram at Arattupuzha temple  and in Ulsavam category is Vrishchikolsavam of Thripunithura Sree Poornathrayeesa Temple. Some festivals include the most famous of these being the Thrissur Pooram. Temples that can afford it will usually involve at least one richly caparisoned elephant as part of the festivities. The idol of the God in the temple is taken out on a procession around the countryside atop this elephant. When the procession visits homes around the temple, people will usually present rice, coconuts and other offerings to the God. Processions often include traditional music such as Panchari melam or Panchavadyam. The festivals of Kerala are famous around the Globe due to its diversity of experience.

Major temple festivals

Common religio-cultural festivals celebrated all across Kerala are:

The major temple festivals of Kerala are:

References

Hindu festivals in Kerala
festivals